The Puffin is a 2010 concept for a hover-capable, electric-powered, personal vertical takeoff and landing (VTOL) technology-concept proprotor aircraft.  The concept design was projected to be capable of flying a single person at a speed of 150 miles per hour (241 km/h), with range expected to be less than 50 miles (80 km) with 2010-vintage Lithium-iron-phosphate battery technology.  The design specified a 13.5 foot (4.1 m) wingspan, standing 12 feet (3.65 m) tall on the ground in its take-off or landing configuration.

A one-third scale model was built in 2010, and was briefly displayed including appearing in one episode of a Discovery network series on invention.

Development 
, NASA achieved the first flight of a one-third scale, hover-capable Puffin technology demonstrator by March 2010 as the first eVTOL (electric Vertical Takeoff and Landing) aircraft concept.  The concept was developed by Mark Moore, with several publications providing details of the design analysis and logic.  By mid-summer 2010, they hoped to "begin investigating how well it transitions from cruise to hover flight".
, the one-third scale model of the Puffin was briefly on display at the NASA Langley campus for the filming of the Discovery network series Dean of Invention. The Puffin simulator was also demonstrated.  The Puffin was slated to appear in the eighth and final episode of the show.  The aircraft was never built at full-scale nor extensively tested.

Concept specifications

See also

References

External links 
NASA.gov:  The Puffin: A Passion for Personal Flight, 2010-02-08.
Electric Icarus: NASA Designs a One-Man Stealth Plane: Could the Puffin, an electric-powered flying suit, change the way we use the sky in war and peace?, Charles Q. Choi, Scientific American, 2010-01-19
Meet the “Puffin,” NASA’s One-Man Electric Plane, Discover Magazine, 2010-01-20.
NASA’s Puffin Is Way Cooler Than a Jetpack, Jason Paur, Wired, 2010-01-21.
NASA Low Noise, Electric VTOL Personal Air Vehicle, computer graphic video.

Tailsitter aircraft
NASA programs
Electric aircraft
Proposed aircraft of the United States